Faion Hicks (born September 17, 1997) is an American football cornerback for the Denver Broncos of the National Football League (NFL). He played college football at Wisconsin and was drafted by the Broncos in the seventh round of the 2022 NFL Draft.

College career
Being ranked as a three star recruit coming out of high school by 24/7 Sports and Rivals.com, Hicks received 10 offers including Appalachian State, Iowa State and Wisconsin University, committing to the Badgers in late 2016 and starting his college career in 2017.

Professional career 
Hicks was drafted by the Denver Broncos in the seventh round, 232nd overall, of the 2022 NFL Draft. He was waived on August 30, 2022 and signed to the practice squad the next day. He signed a reserve/future contract on January 9, 2023.

References

External links
Denver Broncos bio
 Wisconsin Badgers bio

1997 births
Living people
American football cornerbacks
Wisconsin Badgers football players
Denver Broncos players